Four-man bobsleigh at the 1964 Winter Olympics took place on 5 and 7 February at Bob und Rodelbahn Igls, Innsbruck, Austria. This event was last run at the 1956 Winter Olympics, as bobsleigh was not part of the 1960 games.

The winning athletes were those who posted the shortest total time over four separate runs. Canada were surprise gold medal winners, having first entered a bobsleigh team in a competitive event only 8 years previous. Favourites for the event were the Italians who finished in 3rd and 4th. Second place Austria never had an individual run which was quicker than third best, but their consistency earned them the silver medal.

Results

References

External links
Todor – 1964 Four-man Bob

Bobsleigh at the 1964 Winter Olympics